Hydrogogue refers to a substance that promotes watery evacuation of bowels.Fumaric acid salts can be used as hydrogogue cathartics.

References 

Medical treatments